Jurriaan Andriessen (12 July 1742, Amsterdam - 31 July 1819, Amsterdam) was a Dutch decorative painter and graphic artist.

Biography
His father was from Brandenburg and his mother was from Holstein. He began his art studies at the age of twelve with the decorative painter Anthony Elliger. Four years later, he worked with Jan Maurits Quinkhard. In 1760, he attended the Technical School in Amsterdam and was awarded first prize for his graduation work in 1766. That same year, he was accepted as a member of the Guild of Saint Luke and received a major order for wall decorations at the Huis te Manpad in Heemstede.

He worked with Johannes van Dreght and Reinier Vinkeles. In 1770, he was married. The couple settled in Amsterdam, where he and  opened a workshop for making painted wallpaper. His brother Anthonie, who was a carriage painter, also became involved in the business. Idyllic, mythological landscapes were his most popular product. Toward the end of the Eighteenth-century, the interest in painted wallpaper declined, so he joined with Hermanus Numan to paint theatrical scenery; most notably for the Schouwburg of Van Campen.

In addition, he was a notable teacher, whose students include Jan Bulthuis, Jacques Kuyper, Gerrit Jan Michaëlis, Jacobus Schoemaker Doyer, Wouter Johannes van Troostwijk and Johann Georg Ziesenis as well as his son, Christiaan.

In 1799, he suffered a stroke that left him partially paralyzed. In all, he produced over 200 wallpaper designs, many of which are in the collection of the Rijksmuseum. Very few are still to be seen in their original locations. The museum also has his diary, meticulously kept over the course of twenty years.

Selected works

References

Further reading
Richard Harmanni, Jurriaan Andriessen (1742-1819): A Beautiful View, Antique Collectors Club Limited, 2009

External links

Jurriaan Andriessen on Artnet

1742 births
1819 deaths
Painters from Amsterdam
18th-century Dutch painters
18th-century Dutch male artists
Dutch male painters
19th-century Dutch painters
Decorative arts
Dutch people of German descent
19th-century Dutch male artists